Pseudoangonyx is a monotypic moth genus in the family Sphingidae described by Ulf Eitschberger in 2010. Its only species, Pseudoangonyx excellens, described by Walter Rothschild in 1911, is known from Aru, Papua New Guinea and northern Queensland.

Adults have forewings with a bold pattern of pale and dark brown and a curved white stripe. The hindwings are yellow with a dark brown margin.

References

Angonyx
Monotypic moth genera
Moths of Oceania
Moths described in 1911